Arteshbod Abbas Gharabaghi (1 November 1918 – 14 October 2000) was the last chief of staff of the Iranian armed forces as well as deputy commander-in-chief of the Iranian Imperial Army during the rule of Mohammad Reza Pahlavi, the last Shah of Iran. Gharabaghi was one of two senior military officials who were not detained and executed by the Islamic Revolutionary Council.

Background and career
Gharabaghi was of Azeri origin. He served as the gendarmerie commander until 1979. When intensive protests broke out in 1978, both Hassan Toufanian and Amir Hossein Rabii intended to carry out a coup to stabilize the turmoil in the country. Their idea was not backed by other senior military officials, including General Abbas Gharabaghi.

He was appointed chief of staff of the Iranian Armed Forces on 7 January 1979. His role was to support the Shah until the Shah left Iran, and then to support the civilian government the Shah left behind led by Prime Minister Shapour Bakhtiar. However, after much strife on the streets of Tehran and elsewhere, on 11 February 1979 Gharabaghi, along with 22 other senior military leaders, withdrew support of Bakhtiar, thus tacitly supporting the revolutionary Islamic Republic.

Gharabaghi was then assigned as a prosecutor to the Islamic Revolutionary Court, which ordered the killing of many senior Iranian officials who served under the Shah. However, as a result of tensions in Azerbaijan, in 1979 Gharabaghi's relations with Ayatollah Khomeini became tense and he fled from Tehran. The revolutionary authorities sought him, but did not manage to arrest him.  

In December 1979, the exiled Shah argued that the meeting in January 1978 between General Robert Huyser, who was deputy commander-in-chief of the U.S. forces in Europe, and Mehdi Bazargan, who would serve as the prime minister under Ayatollah Khomeini, was organized by Abbas Gharabaghi. He further claimed that Gharabaghi was a traitor.

Works
Gharabaghi published his account of the revolution in his books Haghayegh Darbareye Bohran-e Iran ("Facts About the Iran Crisis", 1983), and Che Shod Ke Chonan Shod? (translated as "Why did it happen?", 1999). He argued that his decision to declare the army's "neutrality" was the main reason for the final triumph of the Islamic Revolution.

In his first book, Gharabaghi expresses his strong support for and loyalty to the Shah and paints a detailed picture of the chaos within the military ranks during the final days of the government, placing the blame on Prime Minister Bakhtiar for its collapse. He justifies his decision to declare the army's "neutrality" as the only reasonable solution given the circumstances in order to prevent further bloodshed, calling Bakhtiar a traitor.

Death
Gharabaghi died in Paris in 2000. He was buried in Père Lachaise Cemetery.

References

External links

1918 births
2000 deaths
Burials at Père Lachaise Cemetery
Exiles of the Iranian Revolution in France
Politicians from Tabriz
Iranian emigrants to France
French people of Azerbaijani descent
Imperial Iranian Armed Forces four-star generals
20th-century Iranian politicians